John Wilkinson (24 January 1886 – 19 September 1918) was a Scottish amateur footballer who played in the Scottish League for Queen's Park as a goalkeeper.

Personal life 
Wilkinson worked as a coal salesman. After Britain's entry into the First World War in August 1914, he enlisted in the Argyll and Sutherland Highlanders and was sent with his battalion to Salonika in November 1915. Wilkinson was serving with the rank of lieutenant when he was killed during the Third Battle of Doiran on 19 September 1918, less than three months before the Armistice. He was buried in Doiran Military Cemetery.

Career statistics

References

1886 births
Scottish footballers
Scottish Football League players
People from Partick
Association football goalkeepers
Queen's Park F.C. players
Argyll and Sutherland Highlanders officers
1918 deaths
British Army personnel of World War I
British military personnel killed in World War I